Sardar Ghulam Muhammad Khan Mahar (Urdu: سردار غلام محمد خان مهر) was chief of the Mahar tribe, and a prominent politician and philanthropist of the Sukkur District. He was first elected as a member of National Assembly of Pakistan in 1964. He became senator in 1973 with the Pakistan Peoples Party (PPP). He was elected a member of the National Assembly in 1977 general elections as the PPP candidate from NA-152 Sukkur II, he was elected Chairman District Council Sukkur in 1979 and remained until 1983. He was Minister for Agriculture when General Muhammad Zia-ul-Haq was the Martial Law Administrator. He won general elections of March 1985 as an independent candidate,  and remained Minister of State for Health from 22 December 1986 to 29 May 1988 in Prime Minister of Pakistan Muhammad Khan Junejo's cabinet. In 1988, post Gen Muhammad Zia-ul-Haq era elections, he was defeated by Pakistan Peoples Party (PPP's) candidate Mian Abdul Haq Alias Mian Mitho. He became a member of National Assembly once again in October 1993 by contesting general elections from NA-152 as the candidate of Pakistan Muslim League (N) and afterward he died in April 1995.

Sardar Mahar 
He became sardar of Mahar tribe at the age of 21. He was involved in politics from 1964 to 1995, and during that period he became federal minister for several times. Khan died on 9 April 1995. After his death, his elder son Mohammed Bux Khan Mahar Minister of Sports Government of Sindh became the "Sardar" of Mahar tribe. SGM Sugar mill in village Waloo Mahar near Ghotki and Ghulam Muhammad Mahar Medical College in Sukkur were named after him.

See also
Ghulam Muhammad Mahar Medical College Sukkur

References

External links
Ghulam Muhammad Mahar Medical College Sukkur 
  The official Facebook website (late) Sardar Ghulam Mohammed Khan Mahar

Year of birth missing
1995 deaths
Pakistani landowners
Mahar family
Pakistani MNAs 1962–1965
Pakistani MNAs 1977
Pakistani MNAs 1985–1988
Pakistani MNAs 1993–1996